This is the list of the municipalities of Portugal under the NUTS 2 and NUTS 3 format. The NUTS 3 regions were revised in 2015; since then, the subregions (NUTS 3) coincide with the intermunicipal communities. The current and the former compositions of the NUTS regions are given below, in the following format:

 NUTS 2 region [number of subregions]
 NUTS 3 region [number of municipalities]
 District (partially or fully belonging to that subregion) [number of municipalities]
 Municipality

Current division

Continental Portugal [5 regions] 
Norte Region (Northern Portugal) [8 subregions]
Porto metropolitan area [17] 
Aveiro District [6] 
Arouca 
Espinho 
Oliveira de Azeméis 
Santa Maria da Feira 
São João da Madeira 
Vale de Cambra 
Porto District [11] 
Gondomar 
Maia 
Matosinhos 
Paredes 
Porto 
Póvoa de Varzim 
Santo Tirso 
Trofa 
Valongo 
Vila do Conde 
Vila Nova de Gaia 
Alto Minho [10] 
Viana do Castelo District [10] 
Arcos de Valdevez 
Caminha 
Melgaço 
Monção 
Paredes de Coura 
Ponte da Barca 
Ponte de Lima 
Valença 
Viana do Castelo 
Vila Nova de Cerveira 
Alto Tâmega [6 municipalities] 
Vila Real District [6] 
Boticas 
Chaves 
Montalegre 
Ribeira de Pena 
Valpaços 
Vila Pouca de Aguiar 
Ave [8] 
Braga District [7] 
Cabeceiras de Basto 
Fafe 
Guimarães 
Póvoa de Lanhoso 
Vieira do Minho 
Vila Nova de Famalicão 
Vizela 
Vila Real District [1] 
Mondim de Basto 
Cávado [6] 
Braga District [6] 
Amares 
Barcelos 
Braga 
Esposende 
Terras de Bouro 
Vila Verde 
Douro [19] 
Bragança District [3] 
Carrazeda de Ansiães 
Freixo de Espada à Cinta 
Torre de Moncorvo 
Guarda District [1] 
Vila Nova de Foz Côa 
Vila Real District [7] 
Alijó 
Mesão Frio 
Murça 
Peso da Régua 
Sabrosa 
Santa Marta de Penaguião 
Vila Real 
Viseu District [8] 
Armamar 
Lamego 
Moimenta da Beira 
Penedono 
São João da Pesqueira 
Sernancelhe 
Tabuaço 
Tarouca 
Tâmega e Sousa [11] 
Aveiro District [1] 
Castelo de Paiva 
Braga District [1] 
Celorico de Basto 
Porto District [7] 
Amarante 
Baião 
Felgueiras 
Lousada 
Marco de Canaveses 
Paços de Ferreira 
Penafiel 
Viseu District [2] 
Cinfães 
Resende
Terras de Trás-os-Montes [9 municipalities] 
Bragança District [8]
Alfândega da Fé 
Bragança 
Macedo de Cavaleiros 
Miranda do Douro 
Mirandela 
Mogadouro 
Vila Flor 
Vimioso 
Vinhais 

Centro Region (Central Portugal) [12 subregions]
Beira Baixa [6] 
Castelo Branco District [6] 
Castelo Branco 
Idanha-a-Nova 
Oleiros 
Penamacor 
Proença-a-Nova 
Vila Velha de Ródão 
Beiras e Serra da Estrela [15] 
Castelo Branco District [3] 
Belmonte 
Covilhã 
Fundão 
Guarda District [12] 
Almeida 
Celorico da Beira 
Figueira de Castelo Rodrigo 
Fornos de Algodres 
Gouveia 
Guarda 
Manteigas 
Mêda 
Pinhel 
Sabugal 
Seia
Trancoso 
Médio Tejo [13] 
Castelo Branco District [2] 
Sertã 
Vila de Rei 
Santarém District [11] 
Abrantes 
Alcanena 
Constância 
Entroncamento 
Ferreira do Zêzere 
Mação 
Ourém 
Sardoal 
Tomar 
Torres Novas 
Vila Nova da Barquinha 
Oeste [12] 
Leiria District [6] 
Alcobaça 
Bombarral 
Caldas da Rainha 
Nazaré 
Óbidos 
Peniche 
Lisbon District [6] 
Alenquer 
Arruda dos Vinhos 
Cadaval 
Lourinhã 
Sobral de Monte Agraço 
Torres Vedras 
Região de Aveiro [11] 
Aveiro District [11] 
Águeda 
Albergaria-a-Velha 
Anadia 
Aveiro 
Estarreja
Ílhavo 
Murtosa 
Oliveira do Bairro 
Ovar 
Sever do Vouga 
Vagos 
Região de Coimbra [8 municipalities] 
Aveiro District [1] 
Mealhada 
Coimbra District [17] 
Arganil 
Cantanhede 
Coimbra 
Condeixa-a-Nova 
Figueira da Foz 
Góis 
Lousã 
Mira 
Miranda do Corvo 
Montemor-o-Velho 
Oliveira do Hospital 
Pampilhosa da Serra 
Penacova 
Penela 
Soure 
Tábua 
Vila Nova de Poiares 
Viseu District [1] 
Mortágua 
Região de Leiria [10] 
Leiria District [10] 
Alvaiázere 
Ansião 
Batalha 
Castanheira de Pêra 
Figueiró dos Vinhos 
Leiria 
Marinha Grande 
Pedrógão Grande 
Pombal 
Porto de Mós 
Viseu Dão Lafões [14] 
Guarda District [1] 
Aguiar da Beira 
Viseu District [13] 
Carregal do Sal 
Castro Daire 
Mangualde 
Nelas 
Oliveira de Frades 
Penalva do Castelo 
Santa Comba Dão 
São Pedro do Sul 
Sátão 
Tondela 
Vila Nova de Paiva 
Viseu 
Vouzela 

Lisboa Region [1 subregion]
Lisbon metropolitan area [18 municipalities] 
Lisbon District [9] 
Amadora 
Cascais 
Lisbon 
Loures 
Mafra 
Odivelas 
Oeiras 
Sintra 
Vila Franca de Xira 
Setúbal District [9] 
Alcochete 
Almada 
Barreiro 
Moita 
Montijo 
Palmela 
Seixal 
Sesimbra 
Setúbal

Alentejo Region [5 subregions]
Alentejo Central [14 municipalities] 
Évora District [14] 
Alandroal 
Arraiolos 
Borba 
Estremoz 
Évora 
Montemor-o-Novo 
Mora 
Mourão 
Portel 
Redondo 
Reguengos de Monsaraz 
Vendas Novas 
Viana do Alentejo 
Vila Viçosa 
Alentejo Litoral [5] 
Beja District [1] 
Odemira 
Setúbal District [4] 
Alcácer do Sal 
Grândola 
Santiago do Cacém 
Sines 
Alto Alentejo [15] 
Portalegre District [15] 
Alter do Chão 
Arronches 
Avis 
Campo Maior 
Castelo de Vide 
Crato 
Elvas 
Fronteira 
Gavião 
Marvão 
Monforte 
Nisa 
Ponte de Sôr
Portalegre 
Sousel 
Baixo Alentejo [13] 
Beja District [13] 
Aljustrel 
Almodôvar 
Alvito 
Barrancos 
Beja 
Castro Verde 
Cuba 
Ferreira do Alentejo 
Mértola 
Moura 
Ourique 
Serpa 
Vidigueira 
Lezíria do Tejo [11] 
Lisbon District [1] 
Azambuja 
Santarém District [10] 
Almeirim 
Alpiarça 
Benavente 
Cartaxo 
Chamusca 
Coruche 
Golegã 
Rio Maior 
Salvaterra de Magos 
Santarém

Algarve [1 subregion]
Algarve [16 municipalities] 
Faro District [16] 
Albufeira 
Alcoutim 
Aljezur 
Castro Marim 
Faro 
Lagoa 
Lagos 
Loulé 
Monchique 
Olhão 
Portimão 
São Brás de Alportel 
Silves 
Tavira 
Vila do Bispo 
Vila Real de Santo António

Overseas Portugal [2 regions] 
Azores, Autonomous Region of [1  subregion]
Azores [19 municipalities] 
Angra do Heroísmo District [5] 
Angra do Heroísmo 
Calheta 
Praia da Vitória 
Santa Cruz da Graciosa 
Velas 
Horta District [7] 
Corvo 
Horta 
Lajes das Flores 
Lajes do Pico 
Madalena 
Santa Cruz das Flores 
São Roque do Pico 
Ponta Delgada District [7] 
Lagoa 
Nordeste 
Ponta Delgada 
Povoação 
Ribeira Grande 
Vila do Porto 
Vila Franca do Campo

Madeira, Autonomous Region of [1  subregion]
Madeira [11 municipalities] 
 [11] 
Calheta
Câmara de Lobos
Funchal
Machico
Ponta do Sol
Porto Moniz
Porto Santo
Ribeira Brava
Santa Cruz
Santana
São Vicente

Before 2015

Continental Portugal [5 regions] 
Norte Region (Northern Portugal) [8 subregions]
Alto Trás-os-Montes Subregion [14 municipalities] 
Bragança District [8]
Alfândega da Fé 
Bragança 
Macedo de Cavaleiros 
Miranda do Douro 
Mirandela 
Mogadouro 
Vimioso 
Vinhais 
Vila Real District [6] 
Boticas 
Chaves 
Montalegre 
Murça 
Valpaços 
Vila Pouca de Aguiar 
Ave Subregion [8] 
Braga District[6] 
Fafe 
Guimarães 
Póvoa de Lanhoso 
Vieira do Minho 
Vila Nova de Famalicão 
Vizela 
Porto District [2] 
Santo Tirso 
Trofa 
Cávado Subregion [6] 
Braga District [6] 
Amares 
Barcelos 
Braga 
Esposende 
Terras de Bouro 
Vila Verde 
Douro Subregion [19] 
Bragança District [4] 
Carrazeda de Ansiães 
Freixo de Espada à Cinta 
Torre de Moncorvo 
Vila Flor 
Guarda District [1] 
Vila Nova de Foz Côa 
Vila Real District [6] 
Alijó 
Mesão Frio 
Peso da Régua 
Sabrosa 
Santa Marta de Penaguião 
Vila Real 
Viseu District [8] 
Armamar 
Lamego 
Moimenta da Beira 
Penedono 
São João da Pesqueira 
Sernancelhe 
Tabuaço 
Tarouca 
Entre Douro e Vouga Subregion [5] 
Aveiro District [5] 
Arouca 
Oliveira de Azeméis 
Santa Maria da Feira 
São João da Madeira 
Vale de Cambra 
Grande Porto Subregion [9] 
Aveiro District [1] 
Espinho 
Porto District [8] 
Gondomar 
Maia 
Matosinhos 
Porto 
Póvoa de Varzim 
Valongo 
Vila do Conde 
Vila Nova de Gaia 
Minho-Lima Subregion [10] 
Viana do Castelo District [10] 
Arcos de Valdevez 
Caminha 
Melgaço 
Monção 
Paredes de Coura 
Ponte da Barca 
Ponte de Lima 
Valença 
Viana do Castelo 
Vila Nova de Cerveira 
Tâmega Subregion [15] 
Aveiro District [1] 
Castelo de Paiva 
Braga District [2] 
Cabeceiras de Basto 
Celorico de Basto 
Porto District [8] 
Amarante 
Baião 
Felgueiras 
Lousada 
Marco de Canaveses 
Paços de Ferreira 
Paredes 
Penafiel 
Vila Real District [2] 
Mondim de Basto 
Ribeira de Pena 
Viseu District [2] 
Cinfães 
Resende

Centro Region (Central Portugal) [12 subregions]
Baixo Mondego Subregion [8 municipalities] 
Coimbra District [8] 
Cantanhede 
Coimbra 
Condeixa-a-Nova 
Figueira da Foz 
Mira 
Montemor-o-Velho 
Penacova 
Soure 
Baixo Vouga Subregion [12] 
Aveiro District [12] 
Águeda 
Albergaria-a-Velha 
Anadia 
Aveiro 
Estarreja
Ílhavo 
Mealhada 
Murtosa 
Oliveira do Bairro 
Ovar 
Sever do Vouga 
Vagos 
Beira Interior Norte Subregion [9] 
Guarda District [9] 
Almeida 
Celorico da Beira 
Figueira de Castelo Rodrigo 
Guarda 
Manteigas 
Mêda 
Pinhel 
Sabugal 
Trancoso 
Beira Interior Sul Subregion [4] 
Castelo Branco District [4] 
Castelo Branco 
Idanha-a-Nova 
Penamacor 
Vila Velha de Ródão 
Cova da Beira Subregion [3] 
Castelo Branco District [3] 
Belmonte 
Covilhã 
Fundão 
Dão-Lafões Subregion [15] 
Guarda District [1] 
Aguiar da Beira 
Viseu District [14] 
Carregal do Sal 
Castro Daire 
Mangualde 
Mortágua 
Nelas 
Oliveira de Frades 
Penalva do Castelo 
Santa Comba Dão 
São Pedro do Sul 
Sátão 
Tondela 
Vila Nova de Paiva 
Viseu 
Vouzela 
Médio Tejo Subregion [11] 
Portalegre District [1] 
Gavião 
Santarém District [10] 
Abrantes 
Alcanena 
Constância 
Entroncamento 
Ferreira do Zêzere 
Ourém 
Sardoal 
Tomar 
Torres Novas 
Vila Nova da Barquinha 
Oeste Subregion (Western Portugal Subregion) [13] 
Leiria District [6] 
Alcobaça 
Bombarral 
Caldas da Rainha 
Nazaré 
Óbidos 
Peniche 
Lisbon District [7] 
Alenquer 
Arruda dos Vinhos 
Cadaval 
Lourinhã 
Mafra 
Sobral de Monte Agraço 
Torres Vedras 
Pinhal Interior Norte Subregion [14] 
Coimbra District [9] 
Arganil 
Góis 
Lousã 
Miranda do Corvo 
Oliveira do Hospital 
Pampilhosa da Serra 
Penela 
Tábua 
Vila Nova de Poiares 
Leiria District [5] 
Alvaiázere 
Ansião 
Castanheira de Pêra 
Figueiró dos Vinhos 
Pedrógão Grande 
Pinhal Interior Sul Subregion [5] 
Castelo Branco District [4] 
Oleiros 
Proença-a-Nova 
Sertã 
Vila de Rei 
Santarém District [1] 
Mação 
Pinhal Litoral Subregion [5] 
Leiria District [5] 
Batalha 
Leiria 
Marinha Grande 
Pombal 
Porto de Mós 
Serra da Estrela Subregion [3] 
Guarda District [3] 
Fornos de Algodres 
Gouveia 
Seia

Lisboa Region [2 subregions]
Grande Lisboa Subregion [8 municipalities] 
Lisbon District [8] 
Amadora 
Cascais 
Lisbon 
Loures 
Odivelas 
Oeiras 
Sintra 
Vila Franca de Xira 
Península de Setúbal Subregion [9] 
Setúbal District [9] 
Alcochete 
Almada 
Barreiro 
Moita 
Montijo 
Palmela 
Seixal 
Sesimbra 
Setúbal

Alentejo Region [5 subregions]
Alentejo Central Subregion [14 municipalities] 
Évora District [13] 
Alandroal 
Arraiolos 
Borba 
Estremoz 
Évora 
Montemor-o-Novo 
Mourão 
Portel 
Redondo 
Reguengos de Monsaraz 
Vendas Novas 
Viana do Alentejo 
Vila Viçosa 
Portalegre District [1] 
Sousel 
Alentejo Litoral Subregion [5] 
Beja District [1] 
Odemira 
Setúbal District [4] 
Alcácer do Sal 
Grândola 
Santiago do Cacém 
Sines 
Alto Alentejo Subregion [14] 
Évora District [1] 
Mora 
Portalegre District [13] 
Alter do Chão 
Arronches 
Avis 
Campo Maior 
Castelo de Vide 
Crato 
Elvas 
Fronteira 
Marvão 
Monforte 
Nisa 
Ponte de Sôr
Portalegre 
Baixo Alentejo Subregion [13] 
Beja District [13] 
Aljustrel 
Almodôvar 
Alvito 
Barrancos 
Beja 
Castro Verde 
Cuba 
Ferreira do Alentejo 
Mértola 
Moura 
Ourique 
Serpa 
Vidigueira 
Lezíria do Tejo Subregion [11] 
Lisbon District [1] 
Azambuja 
Santarém District [10] 
Almeirim 
Alpiarça 
Benavente 
Cartaxo 
Chamusca 
Coruche 
Golegã 
Rio Maior 
Salvaterra de Magos 
Santarém

Algarve Region [1  subregion]
Algarve Subregion [16 municipalities] 
Faro District [16] 
Albufeira 
Alcoutim 
Aljezur 
Castro Marim 
Faro 
Lagoa 
Lagos 
Loulé 
Monchique 
Olhão 
Portimão 
São Brás de Alportel 
Silves 
Tavira 
Vila do Bispo 
Vila Real de Santo António

Overseas Portugal [2 regions] 
Azores, Autonomous Region of [1  subregion]
Azores [19 municipalities] 
Angra do Heroísmo District [5] 
Angra do Heroísmo 
Calheta 
Praia da Vitória 
Santa Cruz da Graciosa 
Velas 
Horta District [7] 
Corvo 
Horta 
Lajes das Flores 
Lajes do Pico 
Madalena 
Santa Cruz das Flores 
São Roque do Pico 
Ponta Delgada District [7] 
Lagoa 
Nordeste 
Ponta Delgada 
Povoação 
Ribeira Grande 
Vila do Porto 
Vila Franca do Campo

Madeira, Autonomous Region of [1  subregion]
Madeira [11 municipalities] 
 [11] 
Calheta
Câmara de Lobos
Funchal
Machico
Ponta do Sol
Porto Moniz
Porto Santo
Ribeira Brava
Santa Cruz
Santana
São Vicente

References

External links
 
 

01
Lists of subdivisions of Portugal